Meresankh IV was a queen of Egypt in the 5th Dynasty. Her name means "she loves life". While some sources consider that her husband is unknown, other sources suggest her husband was Pharaoh Menkauhor Kaiu. It is also possible that Meresankh was the wife of Djedkare Isesi.

Meresankh IV may have had sons: Raemka and Kaemtjenent. The family relationship between Meresankh and Raemka and Kaemtjenent is based on the general dating of their monuments, mastabas in Saqqara. It is possible that Kaemtjenent may have been a son of Djedkare Isesi rather than Menkauhor Kaiu.

The titles of Meresankh IV were: Great one of the hetes-sceptre, King’s Wife, Great of Praises, She who sees Horus and Seth, Priestess of Thoth, Priestess of  Tjazepef, Directress of the butchers in the acacia house, Attendant of Horus, Companion of Horus, Consort of the beloved of the Two Ladies, Companion of Horus.

She was buried in tomb 82 in Saqqara – tomb D5 in Mariette's Mastaba. The tomb only had one chamber and there were no inscriptions on the walls. The text recording Meresankh comes from a stela found in the tomb along with a serdab.

Sources 

25th-century BC women
24th-century BC women
Queens consort of the Fifth Dynasty of Egypt